Todd Julian Fedoruk (born February 13, 1979) is a Canadian former professional ice hockey left winger who played nine seasons in the National Hockey League (NHL) for six different teams. Todd has Ukrainian origin.

Playing career
Fedoruk spent his first seven professional seasons in the Philadelphia Flyers organization after being drafted 164th overall in 1997. He made his NHL debut during the 2000–01 season and played in 220 games over four seasons with the club, recording at least 100 penalty minutes in each season. He played with the American Hockey League (AHL)'s Philadelphia Phantoms during the 2004–05 NHL lockout and took part in that team's run to the Calder Cup championship.

Shortly after the lockout ended, Fedoruk was traded to the Mighty Ducks of Anaheim in exchange for a 2005 second-round draft pick (Pierre-Olivier Pelletier) on July 29, 2005. The 2005–06 season saw Fedoruk post career highs in games played (76), assists (19), points (23) and penalty minutes (174) as a member of the Ducks. The Flyers re-acquired Fedoruk on November 13, 2006, for a fourth-round draft pick.

Fedoruk, who is known for his skills as an enforcer, had titanium plates permanently embedded into his face to repair injuries caused in a fight with Minnesota Wild enforcer Derek Boogaard during the 2006–07 NHL season. Later that season, on March 21, 2007, Fedoruk was once again injured, in a fight against New York Rangers enforcer Colton Orr—Fedoruk was knocked unconscious and had to be carried off the ice on a stretcher.

On July 9, 2007, Fedoruk signed a one-year contract with the Dallas Stars. In at start of the 2007–08 season, Fedoruk struggled to make the lineup and played only a handful of games before he was demoted to the club's AHL affiliate, the Iowa Stars, on November 20, 2007. Before playing a game with Iowa, Fedoruk was claimed off waivers by the Minnesota Wild on November 22, 2007. Fedoruk played out the season with the Wild and scored his first career playoff goal during the Wild's first round defeat to the Colorado Avalanche.

Fedoruk signed a three-year contract with the Phoenix Coyotes on July 1, 2008. In the 2008–09 season, he played in 72 games with the Coyotes, scoring 13 points.

On July 21, 2009, Fedoruk was traded (alongside David Hale) to the Tampa Bay Lightning in exchange for Radim Vrbata.

On August 4, 2011, the Vancouver Canucks signed Fedoruk on a try-out contract to attend training camp. After the conclusion of training camp and in the midst of the pre-season on October 1, 2011, Fedoruk was released by the Canucks without a contract offer, effectively ending his professional career.

Facial injuries
On November 11, 2003, Fedoruk was involved in a scrap with New York Islanders defenseman Eric Cairns. Fedoruk was deemed to have the better of the exchange at the time. but it was not readily apparent that a right from Cairns had broken Fedoruk's orbital bone. Fedoruk underwent surgery, and was back on the ice not long after.

On October 24, 2006, while Fedoruk was playing with the Anaheim Ducks, he challenged Minnesota Wild enforcer Derek Boogaard to a fight. Boogaard landed a brutal punch on Fedoruk that knocked him to the ice and shattered his cheek bone. Fedoruk left the ice immediately after the fight, but was in visible distress, and would not return for the rest of the night. Afterward, Fedoruk underwent considerable surgery to reconstruct the side of his face.

Fedoruk was then traded from Anaheim to his former club, the Philadelphia Flyers. While playing for the Flyers, Fedoruk was involved in another scrap, this time with New York Rangers enforcer Colton Orr. During this fight, Fedoruk was knocked out due to a wild right from Orr. He lay on the ice, unable to move for around four minutes before being put on a stretcher.

Post-retirement
On November 9, 2011, Fedoruk was named assistant coach of the Flyers' ECHL affiliate, the Trenton Titans, for which he had played 18 games in 1999–2000 as a Flyers prospect. He served in the role for two seasons until 2013.

Fedoruk has been a resident of Mount Laurel, New Jersey, with his wife and three children.

Career statistics

References

External links
 

1979 births
Living people
Anaheim Ducks players
Canadian expatriate ice hockey players in the United States
Canadian ice hockey left wingers
Canadian people of Ukrainian descent
Ice hockey people from Alberta
Kelowna Rockets players
Dallas Stars players
Mighty Ducks of Anaheim players
Minnesota Wild players
People from Mount Laurel, New Jersey
People from Sturgeon County
Philadelphia Flyers draft picks
Philadelphia Flyers players
Philadelphia Phantoms players
Phoenix Coyotes players
Prince Albert Raiders players
Regina Pats players
Tampa Bay Lightning players
Trenton Titans players